Florence Mall is an enclosed regional shopping mall northeast of downtown Florence, Alabama. Owned by Hull Property Group, it was renamed from Regency Square Mall in late 2013 as part of a mall wide renovation. The anchor stores are Dillard's (formerly Castner Knott), and two Belk locations (one converted from Parisian, the other from Pizitz and McRae's). JCPenney closed in 2020 and Sears closed in 2017.

On June 4, 2020, JCPenney announced that it would close by October 2020 as part of a plan to close 154 stores nationwide. After JCPenney closed, the 2 Belk stores and Dillard's became the only remaining anchor stores.

References

Further reading

External links 

Florence Mall official website
Property Group

Shopping malls in Alabama
Shopping malls established in 1978
Buildings and structures in Florence, Alabama
Hull Property Group